Desulfomonile limimaris is a bacterium. It is an anaerobic dehalogenating bacterium first isolated from marine sediments. Its cells are large, Gram-negative rods with a collar girdling each cell, like Desulfomonile tiedjei. The type strain is DCB-MT (= ATCC 700979T).

References

Further reading
Neilson, Alasdair H., and Ann-Sofie Allard. Organic Chemicals in the Environment: Mechanisms of Degradation and Transformation. CRC Press, 2012.

Twardowska, Irena, et al., eds. Viable methods of soil and water pollution monitoring, protection and remediation. Vol. 69. Springer, 2006.

External links

LPSN
WORMS entry

Bacteria described in 2001

Thermodesulfobacteriota